John I de Montfort (c.1228–1249, Cyprus), Count of Montfort from 1241 to 1249, son of Amaury de Montfort, count of Montfort, and of Béatrice of Burgundy. In 1248 he joined Louis IX's crusader fleet. Once the fleet arrived at Limassol, it was scattered by fierce storms and was forced to wait there to regroup. John died of sickness, while awaiting the rest of Louis's forces in Cyprus.

Marriage
In March 1248 he married Jeanne de Châteaudun, Dame of Château-du-Loir, daughter of Geoffrey VI, Viscount of Châteaudun, and of Clémence des Roches.  Their only child was:
Beatrice de Montfort, Countess of Montfort-l'Amaury († 1312), who in 1260 married Robert IV (died 1282), comte de Dreux

References

Sources

1249 deaths
House of Montfort
Year of birth unknown
Christians of the Seventh Crusade
1228 births